"There's a Picture in My Old Kit Bag" is a World War I song written and composed by Al Sweet. This song was first published in 1918 by Ted Browne Music Co., in Chicago, Illinois. The sheet music cover depicts a soldier in a trench looking at a picture.

The sheet music can be found at the Pritzker Military Museum & Library.

References

Bibliography 

1918 songs
Songs of World War I